Jeremy duQuesnay Adams (October 1, 1933  May 2, 2016) was a medieval historian, polymath, and translator. His interests included Joan of Arc and the Matter of Britain, as well as human groupings and exclusion.

He was an inspiration for the character Jeremy Hillary Boob in the film Yellow Submarine.

References

External links 

 Obituary at Southern Methodist University
 Obituary in the Dallas Observer

1933 births
2016 deaths
Harvard College alumni
Harvard Graduate School of Arts and Sciences alumni
Southern Methodist University faculty